Anne Byrn (Nashville, Tennessee) is an American cookbook author and the former food editor of The Atlanta Journal-Constitution and The Tennessean.

Biography
Anne Byrn graduated from the University of Georgia with a degree in journalism in 1978, and is a member of Alpha Omicron Pi Women's Fraternity at the University of Georgia. She spent 15 years as the food editor of the Atlanta Journal-Constitution. Later, she studied cooking at La Varenne Ecole de Cuisine in Paris. Byrn also received instruction from Julia Child, Marcella Hazan and other chefs.

By 2013, Byrn had sold over 3.5 million copies of her cookbooks. Member of Alpha Omicron Pi Women's Fraternity at the University of Georgia.

Selected works
 The Cake Mix Doctor. Workman, 1999, 
 The Dinner Doctor. Workman, 2003, 
 Cupcakes!: From the Cake Mix Doctor. Workman, 2005, 
 What Can I Bring? Cookbook (Cake Mix Doctor). Workman, 2007, 
 The Cake Mix Doctor Returns!: With 160 All-New Recipes. Workman, 2009, 
 The Cake Mix Doctor Bakes Gluten-Free. Workman, 2010, 
 Anne Byrn Saves the Day! Cookbook: 125 Guaranteed-to-Please, Go-To Recipes to Rescue Any Occasion. Workman, 2014,

References

External links
 Official Website
 The Cake Mix Doctor
 Anne Byrn on Instagram
 Anne Byrn on Twitter

Living people
American cookbook writers
Women cookbook writers
Year of birth missing (living people)
Women food writers
American women non-fiction writers
21st-century American women
Gluten-free cookbook writers